Redhill may refer to:

Places

England
 Redhill, Bournemouth, Dorset
 Redhill, Herefordshire, a location
 Redhill, Nottinghamshire
 Redhill, Hook-a-Gate, Shropshire
 Redhill, Sheriffhales, Shropshire
 Redhill, Telford, a location in Shropshire
 Redhill, Somerset, England
 Redhill, Staffordshire, a location
 Redhill, Surrey, England
 Red Hill, Worcester, England

Other places

 Redhill, South Australia, Australia
 Hundred of Redhill, Australia
 Red Hill, New Zealand
 Redhill, Aberdeenshire, a location in Scotland
 Redhill, Singapore, Singapore
 Red Hill, North Carolina, United States

Other uses
 Redhill Aerodrome
 Redhill F.C., an English football club
 Redhill MRT station
 Redhill railway station
 Michael Redhill (born 1966), Canadian poet, playwright and novelist

See also 
 Red Hill (disambiguation)
 Red Hills (disambiguation)
 Redhills (disambiguation)
 Redhill School (disambiguation)
 Redhill station (disambiguation)